Nervous Breakdown is the debut EP by the American hardcore punk band Black Flag, released in January 1979 through SST Records. It was the label's first release.

Recording
The recording was financed by Greg Ginn with proceeds he had earned from his mail-order ham radio electronics business, Solid State Tuners (SST). Through Spot, then an apprentice engineer whom Ginn had already known from living in Hermosa Beach, California, the band found Media Art, a studio that had recently completed construction.

The recording was originally supposed to be released through Bomp! Records, but the band felt that the label was taking too long to put the record out. Eventually, the band took the master rights back, and Ginn put some more earnings from his ham radio business, located a pressing plant in the phone book, and co-founded SST Records with Black Flag bassist Chuck Dukowski, borrowing the label's name from his business.

It is commonly misconstrued that Spot was the producer and engineer of Nervous Breakdown. In his sleeve notes for the 1982 outtakes anthology Everything Went Black, Spot pointed out that as an apprentice engineer, his involvement in the sessions was limited to setting up microphones during the tracking sessions, and doing rough mixes for the band to hear.

The initial pressing of Nervous Breakdown was 2,000 copies. Black Flag were able to use the record as "a badge of legitimacy" (according to Dukowski) to begin getting live gigs in the Los Angeles area.

Four other songs were completed during the recording, "Gimmie Gimmie Gimmie", "I Don't Care", "White Minority" and "No Values", which were later released as part of the Everything Went Black compilation album.

Release history
The EP is still in print both in its original form (a 7" vinyl EP), as a 5" CD single, and as part of the anthology The First Four Years. It was also available at times as a 3" CD single, a 10" colored vinyl EP, and as part of the various artists compilation of SST singles, The 7 Inch Wonders of the World.

Track listing

Personnel
Adapted from the album liner notes.

Black Flag
 Keith Morris – vocals
 Greg Ginn – guitars
 Gary McDaniel – bass
 Brian Migdol – drums
On the first pressings of the original 7", Black Flag's second drummer Robo is credited instead of Brian Migdol, despite not performing on the EP, as Migdol had left the group a few months before the EP's release.

Production
 Black Flag – producers
 David Tarling – recording engineer
 Spot – recording engineer, mix engineer
 Raymond Pettibon – artwork

References

1979 EPs
Black Flag (band) EPs
SST Records EPs